Jakub Řezníček (born 26 May 1988) is a Czech football player who plays as a striker for FC Zbrojovka Brno. He played for his country at under-21 level.

References

External links
 
 

Czech footballers
Czech Republic youth international footballers
Czech Republic under-21 international footballers
1981 births
Sportspeople from Příbram
Living people
Czech First League players
FC Zbrojovka Brno players
FK Mladá Boleslav players
MFK Ružomberok players
Association football forwards
1. FK Příbram players
AC Sparta Prague players
SK Dynamo České Budějovice players
FC Viktoria Plzeň players
SK Sigma Olomouc players
K.S.C. Lokeren Oost-Vlaanderen players
FK Teplice players
Expatriate footballers in Slovakia
Czech expatriate sportspeople in Slovakia
Expatriate footballers in Belgium
Czech expatriate sportspeople in Belgium
Czech National Football League players